The Richard B. Russell Special Collections Building holds the Hargrett Rare Book and Manuscript Library, the Russell Library for Political Research and Studies, the Walter J. Brown Media Archives, and the Peabody Collection. The building is named for Richard B. Russell.

The $46 million building was dedicated in February 2012. It includes galleries, oral interviews, videos, and informational kiosks. Tours of the building are offered. A mural by art professor emeritus Art Rosenbaum depicts some of the faces of prominent political figures from Georgia's history.

References

Libraries in Georgia (U.S. state)
University of Georgia